Radharaman Mitra (23 February 1897 – 7 February 1992) was a revolutionary involved with Meerut Conspiracy Case and Bengali writer. In 1981 he received Sahitya Akademi Award for his book Kalikata Darpan.

Early life
Mitra was born in Shyambazar, Kolkata in a Bengali lower middle class family. He passed Matriculation examination from Hindu School, Kolkata in 1913 and passed Intermediate with Gold medal in 1915. In 1917 he completed his graduation from St. Paul's Cathedral Mission College.

Revolutionary activities

Mitra joined in Non-cooperation movement while studying M A. in University of Calcutta. He went to Etawah with his friend another revolutionary Bankim Mukherjee to organise grass route people in support of Gandhism. In 1921 he was arrested and imprisoned in Naini jail for one year. After release Mitra personally met with Mahatma Gandhi at Sabarmati Ashram and worked with him continuously three years. In 1927 he established Kolkata Corporation Teachers Association while teaching in a School in Kolkata. After that he participated in trade union movements, constructed labour organisation in various area of West Bengal. Police again arrested Mitra in Meerat Conspiracy Case but he was released by order of Allahabad High Court. In 1943-44 Mitra joined in the Communist Party of India. He was popular for his Marxist intellectualism, literary works and enormous knowledge about history of Calcutta metropolis. He was also a member Bharat Soviet Suhrid Samity established in 1941. He resigned from the active politics since 1951.

Works
 Bangalar Tin Manishi
 Kalikatay Vidyasagar
 Kalikata Darpan (Vol I,II)
 Devid Hare: His life and works
 Radharaman Mitrer Prabandha

References

1897 births
1992 deaths
Communist Party of India politicians from West Bengal
Bengali communists
Bengali historians
St. Paul's Cathedral Mission College alumni
University of Calcutta alumni
Recipients of the Sahitya Akademi Award in Bengali
Writers from Kolkata
Prisoners and detainees of British India